Lauren Frederick Pfister (born 1951) is a Christian theologian and scholar of Confucianism. He is Professor Emeritus at Hong Kong Baptist University and is a founding fellow of the Hong Kong Academy of the Humanities. He was awarded the honor of "Distinguished Scholar" at the Tenth International Symposium on the History of Christianity in Modern China.

Early life and career
Pfister studied theology and philosophy at the University of Denver in 1973 and the Conservative Baptist Theological Seminary at Denver in 1978. He taught Biblical Hebrew at the Asian Theological Seminary in Philippines before moving to Hong Kong Baptist College, after completing his doctoral studies in Confucian philosophy at the University of Hawaii in 1987.

In the years following, he served as Assistant/Associate Editor of the Journal of Chinese Philosophy (1997-2017), Chairman of China Partner Hong Kong Ltd. (2008-2017), Founding Fellow of the Hong Kong Academy of Humanities (2011-present), Head of the Department of Religion and Philosophy at Hong Kong Baptist University (2011-2012), and Director of the Centre for Sino-Christian Studies (2012-2017). He has published over 130 articles in various journals and a number of books. He gave a special guest lecture at the Confucius Institute for Scotland, University of Edinburgh in February 2008.

Works

Books

Other 
 Pfister, Lauren F., ed. Hermeneutic Thinking in Chinese Philosophy, vol. 1 of the Journal Supplement Series to the Journal of Chinese Philosophy. Boston: Blackwell, 2006. 159 pages. 
 Pfister, Lauren F., ed. Modern and Contemporary Chinese Hermeneutics. Journal of Chinese Philosophy 34, no. 1 (March 2007). 149 pages.

See also
Centre for Sino-Christian Studies
Hong Kong Baptist University

References

Living people
1951 births
Academic staff of Hong Kong Baptist University
Hong Kong philosophers
Hong Kong Protestant theologians
University of Denver alumni
University of Hawaiʻi at Mānoa alumni